The Fateh Burj, a prominent tourist site in Punjab and the tallest tower in India, is situated in the historical village of Chappar Chiri in the SAS Nagar district (Mohali district) of Punjab state.  It was completed in 2011. The  tower is dedicated to establishment of the Sikh Misls in a large part of Punjab in 1711. It is situated in Banda Singh Bahadur Road. It is situated just outside Mohali, a 140kilometres from Amritsar and 20 km from Sirhind.  It was here that Banda Singh Bahadur, one of the most respected and great Sikh warriors, won a decisive battle against Wazir Khan, commander of the Mughal army.

History

In 1710, Banda Singh Bahadur won the battle against Wazir Khan, who commanded the Mughal army at Chappar Chiri. Wazir Khan had planned to stop the march of the Sikh army led by Banda Singh Bahadur to Sirhind. He established his capital at Lohgarh.

Gallery

See also
Khanda museum

References 

2011 establishments in Punjab, India
Monuments and memorials in Punjab, India
Buildings and structures in Mohali
Sikh architecture
Towers in India